Shisheh Garan (also Romanized as Shīsheh Garān) is a village in Sardabeh Rural District, in the Central District of Ardabil County, Ardabil Province, Iran. At the 2006 census, its population was 250, in 53 families.

References 

Towns and villages in Ardabil County